Luis Ángel Rodríguez Ayazo (born 15 February 1995) is a Colombian professional footballer who plays as a centre-back for Finnish club PK-35.

Club career
Born in Turbo, Rodríguez began his career with Categoría Primera A club Envigado. He made his professional debut on 3 March 2017 against Águilas Doradas in the Copa Colombia. He scored his first goal for the club on 17 May against Águilas Doradas, the equalizer in a 1–1 draw. He made his league debut on 8 July against Deportivo Cali, starting in the 2–4 defeat.

In 2019, Rodríguez joined Categoría Primera B club Cortuluá on loan. He made his debut for the club on 4 February in a 2–1 victory against Tigres. He was sent off in his final match for the club on 6 December against Boyacá Chicó.

Tormenta
On 26 January 2021, Rodríguez signed with American USL League One club Tormenta on a one-year deal. He made his debut for the club on 29 May in a 1–3 defeat against Forward Madison, coming on as a substitute.

Career statistics

References

External links
 Profile at Tormenta

1995 births
Living people
Colombian footballers
Association football defenders
Envigado F.C. players
Cortuluá footballers
Tormenta FC players
Categoría Primera A players
Categoría Primera B players
USL League One players
Colombian expatriate footballers
Expatriate soccer players in the United States
Sportspeople from Antioquia Department